Špoljarić is a Croatian surname.

It is one of the most common surnames in the Virovitica-Podravina County of Croatia.

It may refer to:

 Alexander Špoljarić (born 1995), Serbian Cypriot football player
 Danilo Špoljarić (born 1999), Cypriot football player of Croatian and Serbian descent
 Denis Špoljarić (born 1979), Croatian handball player
 Josip Špoljarić (born 1997), Croatian football player
 Matija Špoljarić (born 1997), Cypriot football player of Croatian and Serbian descent
 Milenko Špoljarić (born 1967), Cypriot football player and manager of Croatian and Serbian descent
 Paul Spoljaric (born 1970), Canadian baseball player

References

Croatian surnames